National Cement Company Limited (NCCL), also National Cement Company Kenya Limited, is a cement manufacturer in Kenya. It is a subsidiary of the Devki Group of Companies, an industrial and manufacturing conglomerate, with headquarters in Kenya and operating subsidiaries in Kenya, Uganda and the Democratic Republic of the Congo.

Location
The main factories of NCCL are located off of the Nairobi-Mombasa Road, in the town of Athi River, Machakos County. The coordinates of the main factory are 1°29'31.0"S, 37°03'26.0"E (Latitude:-1.491944; Longitude:37.057222).

Overview
National Cement Company Limited was established in 2008 and began cement production in 2010.

As of April 2018, NCCL was the largest indigenous cement manufacturer in Kenya, with several plants in the country. It owns 100 percent of Simba Cement Uganda Limited, a cement factory in the Ugandan town of Tororo, with installed manufacturing capacity of one million metric tonnes annually.

Ownership
The company ownership as of 2018 is as illustrated in the table below:

Recent developments
In May 2019, NCCL signed a binding all-cash offer of US$50 million to acquire the Kenyan assets and all subsidiaries of ARM Cement Plc. (In Receivership), as a going concern. The offer requires regulatory approval in Kenya.

The ARM acquisition will be funded with US$25 million in internally generated cash and loans from the International Finance Corporation and Kenya Commercial Bank Group. With the new acquisition NCCL will have production capacity of 1,400,000 metric tonnes annually, accounting for 13 percent of total national production.

See also
 List of cement manufacturers in Kenya

References

External links
Website of National Cement Company Kenya Limited

Cement companies of Kenya
Devki Group
Machakos County
Manufacturing companies established in 2008
Kenyan companies established in 2008